Bancontact Payconiq Company was formed following the merger of Bancontact Company and Payconiq Belgium. The company is the Belgian market leader in financial services. Company headquarters are in Brussels, Belgium.

History 
In March 2018 the companies declared their intention to merge with each other. The merger was finalized in July. Nathalie Vandepeute became the CEO. 

In August, the company got a capital injection from its five major shareholders from 17 to more than 32 million euros. 

In January 2019 the company merged its payment applications called "Bancontact" and "Payconiq" into an app called "Payconiq by Bancontact". The app is supported by 20 Belgian banks and 290.000 Belgian stores. Next to the app, the company issues debit cards under the "Bancontact" branding that can be used in physical stores and online. Bancontact Payconiq is a member of the European Mobile Payment Systems Association.

References

External links
 Official website

Payment service providers
Financial services companies of Belgium
Financial services companies established in 2018
Belgian companies established in 2018